Andrew Keary (born 1987) is an Irish hurler who plays for Galway Championship club Killimor. He previously lined out with the Galway senior hurling team. Keary usually lines out as a forward.

Career

Keary first came to hurling prominence at juvenile and underage levels with the Killimor club, while simultaneously playing as a schoolboy with Portumna Community School. He eventually progressed onto Killimor's top adult team. Keary first appeared on the inter-county scene with the Galway minor hurling team. After winning an All-Ireland MHC title in 2004, he captained the team to a second successive title in 2005. He also won an All-Ireland U21HC title in 2007. Keary was drafted onto the Galway senior hurling team in 2006. He made a number of competitive appearances before being released from the panel in November 2008.

Career statistics

Honours

Galway
All-Ireland Under-21 Hurling Championship: 2007
All-Ireland Minor Hurling Championship: 2004, 2005 (c)

References

1987 births
Living people
Killimor hurlers
Galway inter-county hurlers
Connacht inter-provincial hurlers